Volcana (Marsha Rosenberg) is a   fictional character (a supervillainess turned superheroine) appearing in American comic books published by Marvel Comics. The character first appeared in Secret Wars #3 (July 1984). She was created by Jim Shooter and Mike Zeck.

Fictional character biography
Marsha Rosenberg was born in Denver, Colorado. She was a day care center employee who, along with her friend Skeeter, was among the residents of Denver transported to the Beyonder's "Battleworld" during Marvel Comics' first Secret Wars limited series. Seeking power and respect, she and Skeeter agreed to serve Doctor Doom in exchange for super powers. 

Doctor Doom had learned how to operate a machine utilizing alien technology. He used it to grant Rosenberg the ability to transform into a molten lava form with powerful thermal energy blasts, hence her codename "Volcana". She allied herself with Doctor Doom and the criminal faction and battled the She-Hulk in a confrontation with the heroic faction. During the series, she developed a relationship with the supervillain Molecule Man, Owen Reece. She bargained with the Enchantress, and then battled the Enchantress with the intent to renege on her bargain.

During the Secret Wars II limited series, Marsha was residing back on Earth with Owen Reece. They hosted the Beyonder upon his arrival on Earth. She tricked the Molecule Man into challenging the Beyonder and then participated in the defeat of the Beyonder.

Some time later she accompanied the Molecule Man and the Fantastic Four to the Beyonder's universe. She separated from the Molecule Man when he apparently became irrevocably merged into another "cosmic cube" along with the Beyonder. Unlike her friend Skeeter who became the supervillainess Titania, Marsha did some superhero work. She battled the Wizard and Moonstone.

Volcana assisted the Avengers in repairing the damage to the Earth's crust caused by the Beyonder. Volcana later took a comatose Molecule Man to the army hospital. After Molecule Man recovered, he turned the tent they were in into a hot air balloon as Captain Marvel's hologram wanted to talk. Volcana destroyed the projection. Because of the Silver Surfer, Volcana and Molecule Man were redirected to the Avengers and the Fantastic Four. After a brief fight, Molecule Man and Volcana were allowed to return to their apartment in Denver.

Later, she was briefly reunited with a de-powered Molecule Man (who had mysteriously returned to Earth) and battled Klaw. It was at that time that she gained the ability to assume volcanic rock and volcanic ash forms. She subsequently discovered that, just before his supposed "death," Molecule Man had secretly "willed" her a portion of his reality-warping power, and it was this power that gave her the ability to manifest these other forms at critical times, just when she needed them. Once he regained his power from her, she found herself no longer able to tolerate the darker side of his personality. She terminated their relationship, although Molecule Man vowed to one day prove his full love to her.

After losing a lot of weight, Volcana attended the wedding of Absorbing Man and Titania. Marsha discovered that Molecule Man was also invited. When Volcana went to check up on Titania following the supervillain attendees' fight with She-Hulk, she encountered Crystal, and Hydro-Man arrived to help Volcana until Crystal was defeated by Molecule Man.

Molecule Man still pined for Volcana. He captured Doc Samson, and after a fight with Doc Samson and She-Hulk, Molecule Man escaped and used his powers to carve Volcana's face in Mount Rushmore. Marsha saw the news of this on TV but did not suspect Molecule Man made it happen.

During the "Fear Itself" storyline, Titania commented how Volcana just came along for the ride back when Titania was brought to Battleworld as she tells Dr. Wooster at the Farnum Observational Facility in Upstate New York.

Nightwatch later hired Volcana and Titania to fight She-Hulk to keep her from getting the documents that would incriminate him. With the help of her secretary Angie Huang, her supernatural monkey Hei Hei, and Hellcat, She-Hulk was able to defeat them with Huang redirecting Volcana's fire attack back to Volcana enough to melt her.

Powers and abilities
Marsha Rosenberg gained superhuman powers through cellular augmentation performed by Doctor Doom. As Volcana, she originally had the ability to convert her entire body into plasma, in which blazes with white-hot intensity, at times setting aflame on any surface. The alien technology that empowered Marsha makes her capabilities totally undetectable, even when in normal mode.

Later, she possessed two new abilities in her arsenal. She can now transform herself into a basalt-like composition with immense strength and durability that still enables movement or a pumice-like composition whose configuration could control its shape at will. Marsha would not make partial transformations, but she also possesses the qualities of each form one at a time.

In other media

Television
Volcana appears in The Super Hero Squad Show, voiced by Grey DeLisle. This version is a member of Doctor Doom's Lethal Legion.

Novels
 Volcana appears in the novel Spider-Man/X-Men: Time's Arrow: The Present, written by Tom DeFalco and Adam-Troy Castro. Additionally, an alternate universe version of Volcana appears in the book as a member of a resistance movement against a fascist version of the X-Men.

References

External links
 

Characters created by Jim Shooter
Characters created by Mike Zeck
Fictional American Jews in comics
Fictional characters from Colorado
Fictional characters with fire or heat abilities
Fictional characters with superhuman durability or invulnerability
Jewish superheroes
Marvel Comics characters who are shapeshifters
Marvel Comics characters with superhuman strength
Marvel Comics mutates
Marvel Comics female superheroes
Marvel Comics female supervillains